Olumide Ogunade professionally known as ID Cabasa is a Nigerian music producer and singer. He is the founder of Coded Tunes: the record label that signed Olamide, 9ice, 2Shotz and Banky W.

References 

Living people
Hip hop record producers
Nigerian hip hop record producers
Year of birth missing (living people)